The Fuzhou Confucian Temple, more commonly known as Xianshi Temple or Temple of Saints, is a Confucian temple located in Fuzhou, Fujian.

History
The temple was originally built in 773 by Li Yi, an official in the Tang Empire (618–907). The present version was completed in 1851 in the reign of Xianfeng Emperor of the Qing dynasty (1644–1911). In April 1941, Fuzhou was occupied by the Imperial Japanese Army, the temple was used as a warehouse for parking cars and storing gasoline.

After the founding of the Communist State, it was used successively as a school, shopping mall and children's palace. In September 1961, it has been designated as a municipal level cultural heritage by the Fuzhou Municipal Government. On September 2, 1996, it was classified as a provincial level cultural heritage by the Fujian Provincial Government. On May 25, 2006, it was listed among the sixth group of "Major National Historical and Cultural Sites in Fujian" by the State Council of China.

Architecture
Now the existing main buildings include the Gate, Pond, Dacheng Hall, and Zhaobi. The Dacheng Hall in it has double-eave gable and hip roofs covered with yellow glazed tiles, which symbolize a high level in architecture. It is 7 rooms wide and 4 rooms deep. The stone statue of Confucius is enshrined in the center with Mencius and Zengzi lining up on both sides. Inside the hall, plaques written by Qing emperors Kangxi, Yongzheng, Qianlong, Jiajing and Daoguang are hung on the architrave.

References

Confucian temples in China
Buildings and structures in Fuzhou
Tourist attractions in Fuzhou
8th-century establishments in China
8th-century religious buildings and structures
Major National Historical and Cultural Sites in Fujian